Şirinbulaq (also, Alikhanly-Shirin-Bulag) is a village and municipality in the Shaki Rayon of Azerbaijan.  It has a population of 748.

References 

Populated places in Shaki District